Mill Bluff State Park is a state park in west-central Wisconsin, United States. It is located in eastern Monroe and western Juneau counties, near the village of Camp Douglas. As a result, these bluffs are steep and angular, dissimilar to the rounded terrain more typical of the eastern half of the United States. The bluffs served as landmarks to both early pioneers and travelers today on Interstate 90/94, which passes through the park.

Geography
There are ten named bluffs in the park. The park office is at its foot, and the campground is just to the west. To the north is  Camels Bluff, two separate outcroppings that together resemble the humps of a camel. The other, less accessible bluffs are Round Bluff and Sugar Bowl Bluff to the south,  Wildcat Bluff and Bear Bluff to the north, and  Long Bluff to the northeast.

Natural history
The bluffs in the park, and others nearby, are formed of Late Cambrian sandstone.  Stratigraphically, the stone of the bluffs is part of the Galesville Member of the Dresbach Group.  Sandstone from the Ironton Member of the Franconia Formation, which is more solidly concreted, tops each bluff.  This capping layer helped protect the softer stone below it from erosion.  Similar structures elsewhere in Wisconsin would have been bulldozed away by glaciers, but these bluffs lie in the Driftless Area; that part of the American Midwest which was never glaciated.  The bluffs are all outliers of the Franconia Cuesta to the south.

During the last ice age a tongue of ice dammed the Wisconsin River, causing the water to back up into Glacial Lake Wisconsin. For the 3000 years of the lake's existence waves eroded the edges of the bluffs, giving them their distinctive steep sides. Thus in a geological sense the bluffs are sea stacks because they formed in a body of water. In practice the larger formations are described as mesas, the medium-sized ones as buttes, and the smallest as a pinnacle.

The flat ground in the park consists of finely sorted sediments that settled to the bottom of Glacial Lake Wisconsin.  Glacial erratics have been found on the former lakebed, which are explained as rocks which were embedded in icebergs that melted as they were floating in the lake.

The park is mostly forested, with northern pin oak, jack pine, red pine, eastern white pine, and white oak dominant.

Cultural history

Several of the bluffs bear 400-year-old petroglyphs shaped like bird tracks, contemporaneous with the Roche-a-Cri Petroglyphs in Roche-a-Cri State Park.

The diaries and journals of west-bound settlers often mention these bluffs.  A sawmill was operated in the vicinity, after which Mill Bluff was named.

Mill Bluff and a small area at its foot was proclaimed a state park on August 13, 1936.  Mill Bluff State Park was added to the Ice Age National Scientific Reserve in May 1971.  The park's boundaries were expanded to include the other bluffs later.  In 2002 a portion of the park containing all of the major bluffs received a further level of protection as Mill Bluff State Natural Area.

Recreation

Mill Bluff State Park is open from May to September.  Small game hunting is permitted in sections of the park from November 1 to December 15, and deer hunting during a shorter period.

The park's small campground has 21 sites, 6 with electrical hookups.  Amenities are primitive, with pit toilets and no showers.  Potable water is available from hand pumps.

Swimming is available in a  spring-fed lake south of the campground.  Sand has been added to make a  beach.

A  nature trail circles the base of Mill Bluff.  223 stone steps built by the Works Progress Administration in the 1930s lead to its top.   north on County Road W (Funnel Road) is a pullout for the  Camels Bluff loop trail, which passes between the two sections of Camels Bluff and leads past the base of Devils Monument and Cleopatra's Needle.

Because the bluffs are formed of soft sandstone and geologically unique, all climbing is prohibited.

References

Black, Robert F.  Geology of the Ice Age National Scientific Reserve of Wisconsin.  National Park Service Scientific Monograph, 1974.  
Wisconsin Department of Natural Resources. Park brochure, signage, and the Wisconsin Department of Natural Resources website.

External links

Mill Bluff State Park
Mill Bluff State Natural Area
Mill Bluff geology from the National Park Service

Driftless Area
Ice Age National Scientific Reserve
Protected areas established in 1936
Protected areas of Juneau County, Wisconsin
Protected areas of Monroe County, Wisconsin
Rock formations of Wisconsin
Stacks of the United States
State parks of Wisconsin
Works Progress Administration in Wisconsin
1936 establishments in Wisconsin